Andrew Brooks (1969–2021) was an American immunologist, academic, and businessman, known for developing a COVID-19 saliva test.

Andrew Brooks or Brookes may also refer to:
 Andrew Brookes, English aerospace analyst and author
 Andrew Brookes (cricketer) (born 1969), English cricketer
 Andy Brooks, British politician

See also
 Andrew Brook (disambiguation)
 Andrew Brooke, English producer and actor